Salwa Idrissi Akhannouch is a businesswoman and entrepreneur. She is the founder and current president of Aksal Holding, a Moroccan company specializing in retail, cosmetics, luxury goods and malls. Currently, she holds the title of First Lady of Morocco (de facto only, since Morocco already has a Queen Consort). In 2017, she was named as the "Morocco's Leading Lady of Luxury Goods" by OZY.

Career 
In 2001, Salwa Idrissi Akhannouch sealed an agreement with the Spanish group Inditex. In 2004, she inaugurated the first Zara flagship in Africa. Aksal also owns the sole franchise rights for several leading brands in Morocco, including Zara, Banana Republic, Pull & Bear and Gap. Between 2004 and 2019, Salwa Idrissi Akhannouch signed 23 franchise agreements with major international groups  including LVMH, PPR, Inditex, Richemont, Gap Inc., Fnac and The Estée Lauder Companies, among others. In 2011, she inaugurated the Morocco Mall, the second largest shopping center in Africa. Spread over 10 hectares on the Corniche de Casablanca and based on an investment of 175 million euros (250 million dollars). The Aksal group owns 50% of the Morocco Mall. Akhannouch created a Training Academy for careers in retail, the AKSAL Academy, in the same year. In 2017, Salwa Idrissi Akhannouch launched Yan&One, her own brand dedicated to beauty. She opened her new smart beauty and cosmetics store for the brand in Morocco Mall.

Personal life 
Salwa Akhannouch is the sencond highest ranking woman after Princess Lalla Salma ,the Princess Consort.She's married to Aziz Akhannouch, who took office as Prime Minister of Morocco on 7 October 2021.She's therefore the Country's First Lady. They have three children.

Honors and awards 
 2020: Top 10 "Women Behind Middle Eastern Brands" as the creator of Yan&One brand by Forbes
 2018: Ranked among "Fashion Industry's 500 Most Influential Women" by Business of Fashion Magazine
 2017: Named as the one of "Most Influential Women in Business in Africa" by The Africa Report
 2016: Arab Woman of the Year Award for "Achievement in Business"
 2015: 8th rank among the 100 most powerful Arab businesswomen by Arabian Business

References

Living people
Moroccan businesspeople
Chief executives in retail
Retail company founders
Women chief executives
21st-century businesswomen
Shilha people
Year of birth missing (living people)
Moroccan women company founders